Sers is a commune in the Charente department in the Nouvelle-Aquitaine region in southwestern France.

Located to the southeast of Angoulême on a plateau above the river Échelle, Sers is on the edge of the forest of Horte to the south.

The name is pronounced without sounding the final s [sɛʀ].

Neighbouring communes 
Neighbouring communes include Bouëx, Vouzan, Grassac, Rougnac, Dignac, Dirac and Garat.

The area is part of the "Pays Horte et Tardoire".

History 
A rock with magnificent carvings from the Upper Palaeolithic period was discovered in 1927 at the place known as Roc de Sers, in the Échelle valley upstream from Sers. The carvings are in Solutrean style.

A blast furnace and cannon foundry, built in 1514, was in operation until 1762 at Planche Meunier, near Sers.

The dairy and cheese farm built in 1896 on the site of an old flour mill closed at the end of the 20th century.

The population of the commune has increased steadily since the low point of the 1950s.

Population

People from Sers are called sersois.

Sights 
The prehistoric carvings at Roc de Sers can be viewed by contacting the Mairie (Town Hall).

The parish church dedicated to St Peter dates from the 12th century. Its square Romanesque steeple has paired openings with semi-circular arches on the top two levels, and blind arcading below.

The post office was built in the late 17th century-early 18th century as the vicarage for the church. Its main door is a protected historic monument.

On the first Sunday in August, a pilgrimage is made to the 6th century hermitage of Notre-Dame de Bellevau, carved out of the rock. The single pillar which supports the roof has Romanesque decorations.

Facilities 
The village of Sers has a church, a post office, a doctor's surgery, a pharmacy, a school, a baker, a butcher-charcuterie, two bars (one with a restaurant and small grocery, the other also a newsagent) and a hairdresser.

The town hall of the commune is located in the village, in the area known as Le Bourg, near the church.

See also
Communes of the Charente department

References

Communes of Charente